The 1981 FAI Cup Final was the final match of the 1980–81 FAI Cup, a knock-out association football competition contested annually by clubs affiliated with the Football Association of Ireland. It took place on Sunday 26 April 1981 at Dalymount Park in Dublin, and was contested by Dundalk and Sligo Rovers. The competition was sponsored by Mitre. Dundalk won the match 2–0 to win the cup for the seventh time.

Background
The two sides' two previous meetings that season had been in the League, with Dundalk winning both matches – including a 3–0 victory in The Showgrounds in Sligo two weeks earlier. Dundalk had finished as runners-up in the 1980–81 League of Ireland, and had already won that season's League Cup. To reach the final they had defeated non-League Hammond Lane (1–0), St Patrick's Athletic (2–0 in a replay following a 1–1 draw), Drogheda United (1–0 in a replay following a 0–0 draw), and Finn Harps (1–0).

Sligo Rovers were the underdogs, having finished 11th in the League, and were playing in their fifth FAI Cup final, having lost in all four of their previous appearances - most recently in 1978. They had overcome UCD (2–1 in a replay following a 1–1 draw), Home Farm (3–0), and Waterford (1–0 in a replay following a 2–2 draw) to reach the final.

The match was not broadcast live. Highlights were shown that evening on the RTÉ show Sports Scene, with commentary from Jimmy Magee.

Match

Summary
Dundalk were made heavy favourites going into the match, which both managers sought to use as motivation for their players. The match, described in press reports as "wind-spoiled", had a nondescript first half, but seven minutes into the second half a corner taken by John Archbold sailed straight into the net without being touched by anyone. Sligo subsequently pressed hard for an equaliser, but were well-marshalled by the experienced Dundalk defence. In the 78th minute one such Sligo attack broke down, and Mick Fairclough latched onto a long clearance by Sean Byrne to race through and score Dundalk's second to seal the win. The victory gave Dundalk their only FAI Cup and League Cup Double.

Details

References
Bibliography

Citations

External links
RTE's match highlights on YouTube

FAI Cup finals
Fai Cup Final 1981
Fai Cup Final 1981
FAI Cup Final, 1981
FAI Cup Final